Victoria Susan Robey, Lady Robey,  (née Hull, born 1960) is an American-British arts administrator and former banker.

Early life
She is the daughter of Lloyd Nelson Hull (1922-2018), lawyer and civic leader, and Mary Gutfreund (sister of John Gutfreund), who married in 1957. She grew up in Greenwich, Connecticut, US. She was educated at Phillips Academy and Wesleyan University in Connecticut.

Career
She started her career in mergers and acquisitions and corporate finance at Goldman Sachs in New York and London, and subsequently joined executive search company Russell Reynolds Associates.

Robey is chairman of the board of directors of the London Philharmonic Orchestra.

She is a co-founder of Music Masters, a UK-based music education charity which works with schools, teachers and arts organisations with the aim of making music accessible to all.

Honours
She was appointed an OBE for services to music in the 2014 Birthday Honours.

Personal life
In 1987, she married Richard Sharp, a fellow Goldman Sachs banker, in Connecticut. In October 2008, they were living in Kensington, and had an estimated net worth of £500 million. They had three children together.

Some time after 2014, she married British investment banker Sir Simon Robey.

References

Living people
Goldman Sachs people
Wesleyan University alumni
Phillips Academy alumni
American bankers
People from Greenwich, Connecticut
Officers of the Order of the British Empire
Year of birth missing (living people)
Wives of knights